Osilnica (in older sources also Osivnica) is a settlement in southern Slovenia. It is located on the left bank of the Kolpa River next to the border with Croatia. It is part of the traditional region of Lower Carniola and is now included in the Southeast Slovenia Statistical Region. It is the largest settlement and the seat of the Municipality of Osilnica.

Name
Osilnica was attested in historical sources in 1365 as Ossiwniz (and as Ossawnitz in 1456–61 and Ossynnitz in 1498). The name may be derived from the adjective osiv 'grayish'. Derivation from *osьlьnica (< *osьlъ 'donkey' or *osьla 'whetstone') has also been proposed, but is less convincing for vocalic reasons.

History
The Osilnica volunteer fire department became a founding unit of the Kočevje municipal fire department on 28 August 1955.

Church
The parish church in Osilnica is dedicated to Saints Peter and Paul and belongs to the Roman Catholic Diocese of Novo Mesto. It has a cruciform floor plan and was built in 1876 on the site of a 16th-century building.

Notable people
Notable people that were born or lived in Osilnica include:
Stane Jarm (1931–2011), sculptor

References

External links

Osilnica on Geopedia

Populated places in the Municipality of Osilnica